The 2016 U.S. Virgin Islands Republican presidential caucuses took place on March 10 in the U.S. territory of the United States Virgin Islands as one of the Republican Party's primaries ahead of the 2016 presidential election.

While on the same day, neither the Republican Party nor the Democratic Party held any other primaries, the Democratic Party's own Virgin Islands caucuses took place only on June 4.

Six of Virgin Islands' nine Republican delegates were elected during a Presidential caucus. Territorial Caucuses met from noon to 6 p.m. Atlantic Standard Time on St. Croix, St. Thomas, and St. John as a Convention to vote for Presidential Preference and select at-large delegates to the Republican National Convention.

Three party leaders -- the National Committeeman, the National Committeewoman, and the chairman of the Virgin Islands's Republican Party -- attended the convention by virtue of their position. On election day all six delegates were voted to be uncommitted to the national convention in Ohio. This means that they will decide whom to support at the convention. 
All 6 delegates were disqualified by the territorial party and were replaced.  Rubio received 2 delegates, 2 delegates were uncommitted, Ted Cruz received 1, and Donald Trump received 1.  This decision is being contested.

Results

All delegates decided to back Trump after he was determined as the presumptive nominee.

Delegates

RNC Delegates
 John Canegata (Republican Party Chairman) (automatically a delegate)
 Lilliana Belardo de O'Neal (RNC Committeewoman) (automatically a delegate)
 Holland Redfield, II (RNC Committeeman) (automatically a delegate)

Original
 John P. Yob (uncommitted)
 Gwendolyn D. 'Gwen' Hall Brady (uncommitted)
 Warren B. Cole (uncommitted)
 Erica L. Yob (uncommitted)
 George H. Logan (uncommitted)
 Lindsey Eilon (uncommitted)

Replacements
 David Johnson (uncommitted)
 Valerie L.Stiles (Marco Rubio)
 Andrea Lee Moeekel (uncommitted)
 Humberto O’Neal (Marco Rubio)
 Steven K. Hardy (Donald Trump)
 Robert Max Schanfarber (Ted Cruz)

References

Virgin Islands
2016 United States Virgin Islands elections
2016